Patricia Ann Davis ( Reagan; born October 21, 1952) is an American actress and author. She is the daughter of U.S. president Ronald Reagan and his second wife, Nancy Reagan.

Early life
Patricia Ann Reagan was born to Ronald and Nancy Reagan on October 21, 1952, at Cedars-Sinai Medical Center in Los Angeles, California. She is the older sister of Ron Reagan, and the younger adoptive sister of Michael Reagan as well as half-sister of the late Maureen Reagan. She went to grade school at The John Thomas Dye School in Bel Air, and graduated from the Orme School of Arizona in 1970. She matriculated at Northwestern University, where she studied creative writing and drama. She then attended the University of Southern California for two years. She changed her last name to her mother's maiden name, Davis, in an effort to have an independent career. She was active in the anti-nuclear movement before her father was elected president, and continued her activism through his term, stirring controversy and creating strife in the family. Unlike her father, Davis is a critic of the Republican Party, with which she has never been affiliated.

Career
In the early 1980s, Davis acted in a few television shows before getting her first publishing deal. In 1986, she published her first novel, Home Front. She used elements of her own life to create a fictional story, and because of that the book became controversial and she was widely criticized. Following her second novel Deadfall, she wrote an autobiography called The Way I See It, in which she revealed many family dramas and secrets. She has since spoken publicly about how she regrets the form, but not the content, of the critique she presented in the book.

In the July 1994 issue of Playboy, Davis posed for the magazine with a full frontal pictorial. This issue of the magazine also displayed Davis on its front cover. This issue is considered to be one of the magazine's most controversial covers. Davis has posed for other magazines such as More in 2011. Playboy also issued a VHS tape as a complement to the 1994 issue.

When her father was diagnosed with Alzheimer's, she began writing The Long Goodbye which was published in 2004. During that time, she began writing for magazines and newspapers, including The New York Times, Newsweek and Time. Her original screenplay, Spring Thaw, became the 2007 Hallmark Channel movie Sacrifices of the Heart starring Melissa Gilbert and Ken Howard.

Personal life

In 1969, Patti Reagan applied to Ohio University and Northwestern to study journalism, and enrolled in the latter. In the 1970s, Davis lived with Eagles guitarist Bernie Leadon. By this time, her mother, Nancy Reagan, had disowned her for living with Leadon as an unmarried couple. Together, Davis and Leadon co-wrote the song "I Wish You Peace", which appeared on Eagles album One of These Nights. In the 1980s, she dated Timothy Hutton and later had a two-year relationship with Peter Strauss. In recent years, Davis has expressed her frustration about having to date with the Secret Service monitoring her as they had time limits on evening dates and monitoring her and her partners actions together, which is in part, why she rushed her relationship with her future husband, Paul Grilley. In 1984, she married Grilley, a yoga instructor and one of the founders of Yin Yoga. They divorced in 1990, without children and Davis never remarried.

Davis is a vegetarian and has disagreed with laws that outlaw the use of marijuana. In 2011, she launched "Beyond Alzheimer's" at UCLA, which she still runs.

In a September 2018, op-ed for the Washington Post, Davis wrote that she had been sexually assaulted nearly 40 years earlier by a studio executive. The op-ed was released the same week Christine Blasey Ford recounted an alleged sexual assault by Supreme Court nominee Brett Kavanaugh. Davis released the piece in support of Blasey Ford when she had been criticized for not remembering details of the alleged assault.

After the synagogue shooting in Pittsburgh in October 2018, Davis accused President Donald Trump of failing to provide solace to the nation in times of tragedy: "Let's stop asking him!"

In August 2019, Davis wrote an editorial in the Washington Post condemning denigrating comments made by her father about black Africans at the United Nations in a 1971 phone conversation with President Richard Nixon which Nixon taped. The tapes were publicly released the day prior. In the editorial, Davis wrote: "There is no defense, no rationalization, no suitable explanation for what my father said on that taped phone conversation."

In October 2021, she expressed her disdain for John Hinckley Jr. being fully released following the 1981 assassination attempt on her father, a view that contrasted with that of Michael Reagan, the adopted son of President Ronald Reagan and his first wife, Jane Wyman, who expressed forgiveness for Hinckley.

Filmography

Film

Television

Bibliography
Home Front. Crown, 1986 . (quasi-novel)
Deadfall. Crown, 1989. . (novel)
A House of Secrets. Carol, 1991. . (quasi-novel)
The Way I See It: An Autobiography. Putnam, 1992. .
Bondage. Simon & Schuster, 1994. . (novel)
Angels Don't Die: My Father's Gift of Faith. Harper Collins, 1995. .
The Long Goodbye. Knopf, 2004. .
Two Cats and the Woman They Own. Chronicle Books, 2006. .
The Lives Our Mothers Leave Us. Hay House, 2009. .
Till Human Voices Wake Us. CreateSpace, KDP, 2013. . (novel)
The Blue Hour. CreateSpace, KDP, 2013. . (novel)
The Wit and Wisdom of Gracie. Huqua Press, 2014. 
The Earth Breaks in Colors. Huqua Press, 2014.  (novel)

References

Further reading
 Reagan, Nancy. My Turn: The Memoirs of Nancy Reagan (1989), with William Novak. H. W. Brands Reagan: The Life (2015) p. 743 says "she wrote one of the most candid and at times self-critical memoirs in recent American political history."

External links

1952 births
20th-century American actresses
Activists from California
20th-century American non-fiction writers
20th-century American women writers
21st-century American non-fiction writers
21st-century American women writers
Actresses from Los Angeles
American anti–nuclear weapons activists
American memoirists
American people of English descent
American people of Scottish descent
American television actresses
Children of presidents of the United States
Living people
Playboy people
Reagan family
American women memoirists
Writers from Los Angeles